ISFuel Inc. (Integrated Synthetic Fuel Incorporated) is a United States company involved in research & development of synfuels.  In particular, they research the use of coal and biomass to produce a fully synthetic fuel that can pass multiple fuel specifications, or “joint” fuel.

Affiliations 
In 2010 ISFuel Inc. became a member of Commercial Aviation Alternative Fuels Initiative (CAFFI) and ASTM International

Fuel Types
ISFuel Incorporated is currently researching & developing synthetic fuel formulas in which one fuel can pass multiple fuel specifications.

 JS-1 (Joint Synthetic One): A first generation synthetic fuel that incorporates commercial jet fuel (Jet A & Jet A-1), JP-8 (JP-8+100), & Diesel (No.1 & No.2) into one formulated low sulfur fuel.
 JS-2 (Joint Synthetic Two): A second generation synthetic fuel that incorporated all of the fuels of JS-1 with meeting the additional specification requirements for JP-5, JP-7 and RP-1 (including RP-2) fuel types.

Patents
April 26, 2012 a patent application was published for JS-1 fuel.

June 11, 2014 the patent for JS-1 fuel was awarded.

See also

 Synthetic fuel
 Gasification
 Methanol to gasoline
 Biofuel
 Gas to liquids
 Synthetic oil
 Cracking
 Pyrolysis
 Methanol economy
 Karrick process
 Fischer-Tropsch process

References

External links
 ISFuel Inc. Official Website
 ISFuel Inc. Development Blog
 CAAFI Official Website

Energy companies of the United States
Research organizations in the United States
Sustainable energy